Canal 6 (previously known as Telecentro) is a private Costa Rican television channel, owned and operated by Repretel. It is the flagship TV station of the media group.

History
The channel was founded on September 12, 1965 as Telecentro Canal 6, led by Costa Rican and Panamanian investors, led by Mario Sotela Pacheco.

In 1995 under tough TV market conditions, the Corporación Costarricense de Televisión of the Sotela family, decided to lease the TV station to Repretel for 10 years, by 2007, the lease ended, and Repretel bought the station, ending the rumors of Telecentro Canal 6's comeback. It became the third owned and operated station of the group and flagship of the other two.

Programming
Main programming consists of imported shows and soap operas from Univision and Telemundo, also has three daily news programs and carries sports programming of the network, specially Liga Deportiva Alajuelense, Club Sport Herediano, Costa Rica national football team and Fifa World Cup football games. Some programs of the channel are: Guinness Records: Officially Amazing, Wipeout, Alerta Cobra, Scorpion, Baywatch, Hudson and Rex, American Ninja Warrior. Some movies are: 
Live Action Films: James Bond films, Twilight, Ted, Bean, Kindergarten Cop, Alvin and the Chipmunks, Adventures of Bailey The Lost Puppy, Evan Almighty.
Animated Films: The Lorax, Shark Tale, Megamind, Bee Movie.

References

External links 
 Official website

Television stations in Costa Rica
Television channels and stations established in 1965
Spanish-language television stations